Opatkowice may refer to the following places:
Opatkowice, part of the Swoszowice district of Kraków
Opatkowice, Proszowice County in Lesser Poland Voivodeship (south Poland)
Opatkowice, Lublin Voivodeship (east Poland)
Opatkowice, Masovian Voivodeship (east-central Poland)
Opatkowice, Świętokrzyskie Voivodeship (south-central Poland)